Ilamelmis starmuhlneri, is a species of riffle beetle found in Sri Lanka.

Description
Length of the female is 1.9 mm. Dorsum blackish with more shiny elytra. Labrum, antennae, mouthparts, legs and ventrum are rufo-piceous. Pronotum and elytra clothed with greyish recumbent, short setae. Head without impressions. Pronotum with arcuate anterior margin which is deeply sinuate on each side before the angle. Pronotum with very fine and close punctures. Pronotal disc is convex, with a central, shallow, short impression. On each side of pronotum, there is a distinct, prominent sublateral carina which is extending from base to about basal third. Scutellum obovate. Elytra twice as long as pronotum with feebly gibbous humerus. Elytral surface is striate-punctate with round strial punctures. First four strial intervals are broader than the strial punctures. Sides of the prosternum, metasternum and abdomen with a reticulate, alutaceous microsculpture. Prosternal process not very broad, punctate. Metasternum more shiny, finer and more sparsely punctured. Legs moderately long where claws lack teeth.

References 

Elmidae
Insects of Sri Lanka
Insects described in 1973